The Pancyprian Public Servants' Trade Union (PASY-DY) is a trade union centre in Cyprus. It was founded in 1927 as the Cyprus Civil Service Association. It is affiliated with the Public Services International.

References

External links
www.pasydy.org

Trade unions in Cyprus
Public Services International
1927 establishments in Cyprus
Trade unions established in 1927